The O'Reilly Auto Parts 500 was a NASCAR Cup Series stock car race held at Texas Motor Speedway (TMS) in Fort Worth, Texas. Austin Dillon was the last race winner having won it in 2020.

Race history
The first two runnings of the race were controversial, crash-strewn affairs, with universal criticism that the track's design was one groove; Kenny Wallace argued, "They're so busy building condos they don't have time to fix the racetrack."

There were ten different winners in the first ten races, the longest such streak for any NASCAR track in the Monster Energy NASCAR Cup Series. This list includes Texas Native Terry Labonte, who won in 1999, and Dale Earnhardt Jr. winning his first race in 2000.  Jeff Burton, the winner of the inaugural race, broke that streak by getting his second Texas win in a last-lap pass in 2007. In 2011, the race became a Saturday night event, whereas before it was always a Sunday afternoon race. This was done since the night race at Phoenix was moved to February and became a day race. The 2011 race was run on April 9, 2011, and was the first scheduled night race of the season, and in Texas Motor Speedway history for the Cup Series.

In 2013, NASCAR became involved in controversy when the National Rifle Association (NRA) began to sponsor the race; although race sponsorships are negotiated with the track owner, not NASCAR itself, the sanctioning organization has final approval and did not object to the sponsorship. Both NASCAR's acceptance of this sponsorship, and its timing, has been controversial, and offensive to gun control activists. Because of the sponsorship, Senator Chris Murphy asked Rupert Murdoch, whose News Corporation owns Fox Sports, which was scheduled to air the race, to not broadcast it. Fox broadcast the race as scheduled, not least because failure to do so would have been a breach of the network's contract with NASCAR. However, Fox only used the official sponsored name once per hour (the minimum mandated by NASCAR) and otherwise referred to it generically (in this case as the "Texas 500"), the network's usual practice when a race's title sponsor does not buy ads during the race broadcast; the NRA reportedly did not seek to purchase any such ads. The NRA would return as a race sponsor in 2016 for the Bristol Night Race in August at Speedway's owned Bristol Motor Speedway.

In 2014, the race returned to being a Sunday afternoon race because of the NCAA Men's Basketball Final Four games being held at AT&T Stadium in nearby Arlington so that the race occurs on a day in between tournament games. On February 6, 2014, Duck Commander, the business that is the subject of the TV show Duck Dynasty, bought the naming rights for the race. The race returned to its Saturday night date in 2015. In 2017, the race would once again return to Sunday afternoon and the race was renamed under a new sponsorship deal with O'Reilly Auto Parts.

Since 2002, the trophy awarded to the winner has been cowboy boots, a white cowboy hat, and a pair of six-shooters to fire off in victory lane. The winner of the event and the same goes for the Fall race, bolts their name onto a Wall of Champions that have their name engraved on a plate using a laser engraver.

Samsung sponsored the race from 2002 to 2012, while RadioShack was previously a co-sponsor. The joint sponsorship was grandfathered in 2003 by NASCAR's grandfather clause when Nextel became a NASCAR sponsor, as they banned rival wireless sponsorships (Nextel used Motorola exclusively); the ban was lifted after the 2005 merger of Sprint and Nextel because Sprint is sold at RadioShack, and Sprint offers Samsung products.

The race was removed from the 2021 NASCAR Cup Series as Texas Motor Speedway instead hosted NASCAR All-Star Race and Circuit of the Americas in Austin was added to the schedule.

Past winners

Notes
2002, 2010, & 2014: Race moved from Sunday afternoon to Monday afternoon due to rain.
2008 and 2014: Race extended due to a NASCAR Overtime finish
2011: First scheduled night event in NASCAR Cup Series history at Texas Motor Speedway.
2016: The race was delayed by rain for 2 hours. Race was completed early Sunday morning at 2:45 am CT.
2020: Race postponed from March 29 to July 19 due to the COVID-19 pandemic.

Multiple winners (drivers)

Multiple winners (teams)

Manufacturer wins

References

External links
 

1997 establishments in Texas
 
NASCAR Cup Series races
Recurring sporting events established in 1997
Annual sporting events in the United States
Recurring sporting events disestablished in 2020